Kalyanapuram Rangachari Parthasarathy (born 25 June 1936) is professor emeritus at the Indian Statistical Institute and a pioneer of quantum stochastic calculus.

Biography
He was born in 1936 at Chennai, into a modest but deeply religious Hindu Brahmin family.  He studied at the Ramakrishna Mission Vivekananda College, where he completed the B.A. (Honours) course in Mathematics, and moved to the Indian Statistical Institute, Kolkata, where he completed his Ph.D., under the supervision of C. R. Rao in 1962. He was one of the "famous four" (the others were R. Ranga Rao, Veeravalli S. Varadarajan, and S. R. Srinivasa Varadhan) in ISI during 1956–1963. He was awarded the first Ph.D. degree of ISI. He received the Shanti Swarup Bhatnagar Prize for Science and Technology in Mathematical Science in 1977 and the TWAS Prize in 1996.

Research
He worked at the Steklov Mathematical Institute, USSR Academy of Sciences (1962–63), as Lecturer where he collaborated  with Andrey Kolmogorov. Later he came to United Kingdom as Professor of Statistics in University of Sheffield (1964–68),  University of Manchester (1968–70)  and later at University of Nottingham where he collaborated  with Robin Lyth Hudson on their pioneering work in quantum stochastic calculus. Then he returned to India, and after a few years in Bombay University and the Indian Institute of Technology, Delhi, he came back in 1976 to the new Indian Statistical Institute, Delhi Centre and he stayed there until he retired in 1996.

He is the namesake of Kostant–Parthasarathy–Ranga Rao–Varadarajan determinants along with Bertram Kostant, R. Ranga Rao and Veeravalli S. Varadarajan which they introduced in 1967.

Books authored
Among the books he has authored are:
 K. R. Parthasarathy. Probability measures on metric spaces. Vol. 352. American Mathematical Society, 1967.
 Robin Lyth Hudson and K. R. Parthasarathy. "Quantum Ito's formula and stochastic evolutions." Communications in Mathematical Physics 93.3 (1984): 301–323.
 K. R. Parthasarathy. An introduction to quantum stochastic calculus. Vol. 85. Springer, 1992.
 K. R. Parthasarathy and Klaus Schmidt. "Positive definite kernels, continuous tensor products, and central limit theorems of probability theory" (series: Lecture Notes in Mathematics). (1972).

References

External links

K. R. Parthasaraty at Indian Statistical Institute (Delhi Center)
https://web.archive.org/web/20120728070024/http://www.mathunion.org/Publications/Bulletins/39/parthasarathy.ps

1936 births
Living people
Indian statisticians
20th-century Indian mathematicians
21st-century Indian mathematicians
Probability theorists
Indian Statistical Institute alumni
Academic staff of the Indian Statistical Institute
Scientists from Chennai
TWAS laureates
Recipients of the Shanti Swarup Bhatnagar Award in Mathematical Science